Tyler Jay French (born 12 February 1999) is an English professional footballer who plays as a defender for Dundee.

Early and personal life
Born in Bury St Edmunds, French attended Ormiston Sudbury Academy. He grew up supporting Liverpool.

Career
French spent his early career in non-league football with Long Melford, Hadleigh United and A.F.C. Sudbury. He combined his non-league playing career with a part-time job building conservatory bases. In early 2019 he trialled with Football League clubs Barnsley and Charlton Athletic, and was transfer listed by Sudbury in an attempt to move up the league system. He also had trials at Crystal Palace, Leicester City, and Ipswich Town.

Following a successful trial period, he signed a two-year professional contract with League Two club Bradford City in May 2019. French said that he would be spending the summer before the start of the 2019–20 season training, stating that "I won't have much time off because I want to get myself in the best shape possible for pre-season [...] I've got an off-season [training] programme to help me but I'm quite naturally fit, so hopefully I'll be all right". He scored his first goal for Bradford when he scored in an EFL Trophy tie against Rochdale on 12 November 2019.

In February 2020 he moved on loan to AFC Fylde. He credited his time at Fyle for helping him getting used to a higher level of football.

French was praised by club captain Richard O'Donnell after an impressive performance in the opening day of the 2020–21 season. On 31 January 2021 it was announced that he had left the club.

On 1 February 2021, he signed for Wrexham. He was sent off on his debut for the club a day later.

On 5 July 2022, French joined Scottish Championship side Dundee for an undisclosed fee on a two-year deal. He made his competitive debut for Dundee in an away Scottish League Cup win over Stranraer, starting the match. The following week, French scored his first goal for the club in a 5–1 win over Forfar Athletic. On 21 January 2023, French suffered a serious injury to his right leg during a Scottish Cup match against St Mirren, which would leave him out of action for a period of time.

Career statistics

References

1999 births
Living people
English footballers
Long Melford F.C. players
Hadleigh United F.C. players
A.F.C. Sudbury players
Bradford City A.F.C. players
AFC Fylde players
Wrexham A.F.C. players
English Football League players
Association football defenders
Isthmian League players
National League (English football) players
Sportspeople from Bury St Edmunds
Dundee F.C. players